Terry Brian Hermansson, is a New Zealand former professional rugby league footballer. An international representative , he played club football in England, Australia and New Zealand.

Playing career
Hermansson was a Schoolboy Kiwi in 1982 and made the Junior Kiwis in 1985.

Nicknamed "The Rock" he spent his early years playing for the Canterbury sides of the 1990s before moving overseas to play professionally, first for Doncaster in England and then for the South Sydney Rabbitohs in the then NSWRL Premiership.  Hermansson played for Souths in their upset 1994 Tooheys Challenge Cup final victory over Brisbane. 

At the height of the Super League war he moved to the Sydney City Roosters and played alongside fellow Kiwi prop Jason Lowrie. He returned to the South Sydney club in 1998 before signing for the Adelaide Rams for the 1999 NRL season.

When the Rams were closed down before the season he signed a two-year contract with the Auckland Warriors, returning home to play in front of the New Zealand fans. In 1999 he was Clubman of the Year Award.

Representative career
Hermansson played for the New Zealand national rugby league team on four occasions between 1994 and 1999, with the Superleague war blocking him from making more appearances. During the war he played for an Australian Rugby League "Rest of the World" side that took on the Australian Kangaroos.

In 2000 he represented the Aotearoa Māori at the 2000 Rugby League World Cup. He retired in 2000 after the World Cup.

Later years
On retirement, he returned to his native Christchurch and concentrated on coaching, winning several scholarships to improve his skills. He has coached the Canterbury under-18 side and in 2005 he coached the New Zealand under-16 side when they toured Australia.

In 2004 Hermansson was the assistant coach of the New Zealand Māori side in the Pacific Cup.

References

1967 births
Living people
New Zealand rugby league players
New Zealand Māori rugby league players
New Zealand Māori rugby league team players
New Zealand national rugby league team players
New Zealand rugby league coaches
Canterbury rugby league team players
Doncaster R.L.F.C. players
South Sydney Rabbitohs players
Sydney Roosters players
New Zealand Warriors players
New Zealand Warriors captains
Junior Kiwis players
Rugby league props
Rugby league players from Christchurch